Joydeep Karmakar (born 7 September 1979) is an Indian sports shooter from Kolkata, West Bengal. He represented India in rifle prone events in various championships. started his sports career in 1989. He became a Junior National Champion in his first Nationals in 1994. He has represented India in 28 World Cups 2 Commonwealth Games 1 Asian Games 3 World Championships. He qualified to represent India at London 2012 Summer Olympics in men's 50 metre rifle prone event. His career best world ranking is 4th and in Asia 1st in 2010 to 2012.

Career 
On 3 August 2012, Joydeep qualified for the Olympic Finals of Men's 50metre Rifle Prone event  After six rounds, Joydeep was at joint fourth with eight other shooters. However, there was a shoot off between the nine tied shooters, in which Joydeep scored 51.6 and finished fourth in the shoot off, thereby qualifying for the final round as he finished 7th overall. In the final he scored 104.1 and with a total of 699.1 he finished fourth, behind the bronze medal winner, Rajmond Debevec of Slovenia.

Earlier in 2010 he had participated in ISSF World Cup, Sydney and won a silver medal with an Asian Record score of 599/600. He is still the only silver medalist in World Cup in Prone event from India. 
His National Record Scores of 594/600, 595, 598 & 599 from 2005 to 2010 was unique as Joydeep only bettered his own record. Apart from more than 70 National Medals, he also won Individual Australian Open Cup, Commonwealth Championships Gold and South Asian double Gold.

In Domestic competitions he held the Kumar Surendra Singh record of 597/600 in Prone. He participated in International tournaments till 2015, including 2014 Glasgow Commonwealth Games and 2014 Incheon Asian Games and ISSF World Championships in Granada, Spain.

In late 2015 he set up a shooting academy in Kolkata named Joydeep Karmakar Shooting Academy, at New Town, Kolkata. Later in 2018, he opened the other two branches of JKSA at Ballygunge and Bally, which is named as Shooting Sports Club Howrah. where he with other National & International shooters are training newcomers to the nuances of Rifle Shooting. Karmakar is the coach and mentor of 2018 Commonwealth Games and 2018 Summer Youth Olympics silver medallist Mehuli Ghosh.

Summer Olympics 

In 2012 Summer Olympics Karmakar qualified for the finals of men's 50 metre rifle prone with a score of 595. In the final he scored 104.1 and finished fourth with a total score of 699.1, behind the bronze medal winner, Rajmond Debevec of Slovenia, whose aggregate score was 701.

Personal life 
Karmakar was born on 7 December 1979, to  Santo Karmakar and Gayatri Karmakar, in Kolkata, West Bengal. His father, Santo Karmakar was a three-time national swimming champion. He is married to Radhica Karmakar.

Awards and accolades 
Joydeep Karmakar has received the following awards and accolades:

 Arjuna Award in 2012
 West Bengal Khel Samman Award in 2013–14
 ABP Shera Bangali 2013

References

External links 

 Joydeep Karmakar ISSF profile

Living people
1979 births
Indian male sport shooters
ISSF rifle shooters
Shooters at the 2012 Summer Olympics
Olympic shooters of India
Recipients of the Arjuna Award
Seth Anandram Jaipuria College alumni
University of Calcutta alumni
Shooters at the 2014 Asian Games
Asian Games competitors for India
Shooters at the 2014 Commonwealth Games
Indian sports coaches